The 2021–22 season was the 98th season in the existence of Rayo Vallecano and the club's first season back in the top flight of Spanish football. In addition to the domestic league, Rayo Vallecano participated in this season's edition of the Copa del Rey.

Players

First-team squad

Reserve team

Out on loan

Transfers

In

Out

Pre-season and friendlies

Competitions

Overall record

La Liga

League table

Results summary

Results by round

Matches
The league fixtures were announced on 30 June 2021.

Copa del Rey

Statistics

Appearances and goals

|-
! colspan=14 style=background:#dcdcdc; text-align:center|Goalkeepers

|-
! colspan=14 style=background:#dcdcdc; text-align:center|Defenders

|-
! colspan=14 style=background:#dcdcdc; text-align:center|Midfielders

|-
! colspan=14 style=background:#dcdcdc; text-align:center|Forwards

|-
! colspan=14 style=background:#dcdcdc; text-align:center|Players who have made an appearance this season but have left the club
|-
|}

Top Goalscorers

References

Rayo Vallecano seasons
Rayo Vallecano